Sesamum is a leguminous crop and genus of about 20 species in the flowering plant family Pedaliaceae. The plants are annual or perennial herbs with edible seeds. The best-known member of the genus is sesame, Sesamum indicum (syn. Sesamum orientale), the source of sesame seeds. The species are primarily African, with some species occurring in India, Sri Lanka, and China. The origin of S. indicum is uncertain, as it is widely cultivated and naturalized in tropical regions. The genus is closely related to the strictly African genus Ceratotheca and is itself probably African in origin.

Species
Species include:
Sesamum abbreviatum Merxm.
Sesamum alatum Thonn.
Sesamum angolense Welw.
Sesamum biapiculatum De Wild.
Sesamum calycinum Welw.
Sesamum capense Burm. f.
Sesamum digitaloides Welw. ex Schinz
Sesamum gracile Endl.
Sesamum hopkinsii Suess.
Sesamum indicum L.
Sesamum lamiifolium Engl.
Sesamum latifolium J.B. Gillett
Sesamum lepidotum Schinz
Sesamum macranthum Oliv.
Sesamum marlothii Engl.
Sesamum mombazense De Wild. & T.Durand
Sesamum parviflorum Seidenst.
Sesamum pedalioides Welw. ex Hiern
Sesamum radiatum Schumach. & Thonn.
Sesamum rigidum Peyr.
Sesamum rostratum Hochst.
Sesamum sabulosum A.Chev.
Sesamum schinzianum Asch.
Sesamum somalense Chiov.
Sesamum thonneri De Wild. & T. Durand
Sesamum triphyllum Welw. ex Asch.

Gallery

References

Lamiales genera
Pedaliaceae